Native Tongue is a feminist science fiction novel by American writer Suzette Haden Elgin, the first book in her series of the same name. The trilogy is centered in a future dystopian American society where the 19th Amendment was repealed in 1991 and women have been stripped of civil rights. A group of women, part of a worldwide group of linguists who facilitate human communication with alien races, create a new language for women as an act of resistance. Elgin created that language, Láadan, and instructional materials are available.

Plot summary
Native Tongue follows Nazareth, a talented female linguist in the 22nd century – generations after the repeal of the 19th Amendment.  Nazareth is part of a small group of linguists "bred" to become perfect interstellar translators.

Nazareth looks forward to retiring to the Barren House – where women past childbearing age go as they wait to die – but learns that the women of the Barren Houses are creating a language to help them break free of male dominance.

Reception
The book was nominated for the 1985 Locus Award for Best Science Fiction Novel and the 1985 Ditmar Award for International Fiction.

Elgin has said about the book:

Adaptations 

Until Media acquired the rights to the trilogy and are currently producing a screen adaptation.

See also 
 Nü Shu, the Chinese system of women's writing
 The Handmaid's Tale, a dystopic speculative fiction novel by Margaret Atwood
 The Languages of Pao, science fiction novel in which manipulation of language is used to shape a civilization

References

Sources
 Mohr, Dunja M. Worlds Apart: Dualism and Transgression in Contemporary Female Dystopias. Jefferson, NC, McFarland, 2005. [extensive chapter on the Native Tongue Series]
Interview With Suzette Haden Elgin @ Womenwriters.net. 1999.  https://web.archive.org/web/20120205054437/http://www.womenwriters.net/editorials/hadenelgin.htm

External links
 Native Tongue trilogy homepage
 Láadan language
 
 "We have always spoken Panglish" (Panglish appears in Native Tongue)

Feminist science fiction novels
American science fiction novels
1984 science fiction novels
1984 American novels
Dystopian novels
DAW Books books
Fiction set in 1991